This article contains references to literature on the Amish in the following field: Education, Health, Music and Tourism. There is also a list of list of literature in the article Amish.

Education

Fischer, Sara and Stahl, Rachel K: "Amish School (People's Place Booklet, No. 6)", Intercourse, PA, 1997.

Health

Bipolar affective disorder

Cystic fibrosis

Diabetes

Happiness

Healthcare

Inbreeding

Obesity

Music

Tourism

References

Handbook of Denominations in the United States, by Frank S. Mead, et al.
Mennonite Encyclopedia, Cornelius J. Dyck, Dennis D. Martin, et al., editors

External links
Old Order Amish Global Anabaptist Mennonite Encyclopedia Online article by John A. Hostetler

 
Anabaptism in Pennsylvania
Religion in Lancaster, Pennsylvania